Bivand may refer to:
 Bivand-e Olya
 Bivand-e Sofla